The Unissued 1975 Copenhagen Studio Recordings is an album by the Warne Marsh Quartet, recorded in Denmark in late 1975 but not released on the Storyville label until 1997.

Reception 

The AllMusic review noted: "This studio set matches Marsh with guitarist Dave Cliff, bassist Niels Pedersen and drummer Alan Levitt. His sidemen's tasteful yet stimulating support allows Marsh to be in the spotlight virtually the entire time ... the unique tenorman's cool tone and harmonically advanced style are heard in superb form".

Track listing 
 "Blues in G Flat" (Warne Marsh) – 7:26
 "After You've Gone" (Turner Layton, Henry Creamer) – 3:35
 "The Song Is You" [take 1] (Jerome Kern, Oscar Hammerstein II) – 6:12
 "Lennie Bird" [take 2] (Lennie Tristano) – 5:52
 "It's You or No One" [take 2] (Jule Styne, Sammy Cahn) – 6:05
 "God Bless the Child" (Arthur Herzog Jr., Billie Holiday) – 6:41
 "The Way You Look Tonight" (Jerome Kern) – 5:52
 "Without a Song" (Vincent Youmans) – 6:24
 "You Don't Know What Love Is" (Gene de Paul, Don Raye) – 6:25
 "Be My Love" (Nicholas Brodszky) – 5:42
 "Lennie Bird" [take 3] (Tristano) – 5:03

Personnel 
Warne Marsh – tenor saxophone
Dave Cliff – guitar
Niels-Henning Ørsted Pedersen – bass
Al Levitt – drums

References 

Warne Marsh albums
1997 albums
Storyville Records albums